The Republic of Upper Volta was a landlocked West African country established on 11 December 1958 as a self-governing colony within the French Community. Before becoming autonomous, it had been part of the French Union as the French Upper Volta. On 5 August 1960, it gained full independence from France. On 4 August 1984, it changed its name to Burkina Faso.

Etymology 

The name Upper Volta indicated that the country contains the upper part of the Volta River.

History 
Upper Volta obtained independence on 5 August 1960, with Maurice Yaméogo of the Voltaic Democratic Union-African Democratic Rally (UDV-RDA) becoming the country's first president. A constitution was ratified the same year, establishing presidential elections by direct universal suffrage and a National Assembly with five-year terms. Shortly after coming to power, Yaméogo banned all political parties other than the UDV-RDA. He had shown a deep authoritarian streak even before then, however; between the time he became prime minister of Upper Volta while it was still a French colony and independence two years later, opposition parties were subjected to increased harassment.

On 3 January 1966, Yaméogo was overthrown in a coup d'état led by army chief of staff Sangoulé Lamizana. Although multiparty democracy was nominally restored four years later, Lamizana dominated the country's politics until he was himself overthrown in 1980.

After a series of short-term presidencies, Thomas Sankara then came to power through a military coup d'état on 4 August 1983. After the coup, he formed the National Council for the Revolution (CNR), with himself as president. Under the direction of Sankara, the country changed its name on 4 August 1984, from Upper Volta to Burkina Faso, which means "Land of Incorruptible People".

Politics 
From 1958 to 1960, the Republic of Upper Volta was led by a high commissioner:
 Max Berthet (11 December 1958 to February 1959),
 Paul Masson (February 1959 to 5 August 1960).
From 1971 to 1987, the Republic of Upper Volta was led by a prime minister:
 Gérard Kango Ouedraogo (13 February 1971 to 8 February 1974)
 Thomas Sankara (4 August 1983 to 14 October 1987)

Symbols

Flag 

The colours of the national flag corresponded to the names of its three main tributaries: the Black Volta, the White Volta and the Red Volta. The flag was identical to that of the German Empire.

National Hymn 

In French:

Fière Volta de mes aieux,
Ton soleil ardent et glorieux
Te revêt d'or et de fierté
Ô Reine drapée de loyauté !

Nous te ferons et plus forte, et plus belle
À ton amour nous resterons fidèles
Et nos cœurs vibrant de fierté
Acclameront ta beauté
Vers l'horizon lève les yeux
Frémis aux accents tumultueux
De tes fiers enfants tous dressés
Promesses d'avenir caressées

Le travail de ton sol brûlant
Sans fin trempera les cœurs ardents,
Et les vertus de tes enfants
Le ceindront d'un diadème triomphant.

Que Dieu te garde en sa bonté,
Que du bonheur de ton sol aimé,
L'Amour des frères soit la clé,
Honneur, Unité et Liberté.

In English:

Proud Volta of my ancestors,
Your ardent and glorious sun
Takes you with gold and pride
O Queen draped with loyalty!

We will make you stronger and more beautiful
To your love we will remain faithful
And our hearts vibrant with pride
Will acclaim your beauty
Towards the horizon look up
Frisks with the tumultuous accents
Of your proud children all trained
Caressed promises of future

The work of your burning ground
Endless will soak the ardent hearts,
And the virtues of your children
The girdle of a triumphant diadem.

May God keep you in his goodness,
May the happiness of your beloved soil,
The love of the brethren be the key,
Honor, Unity and Freedom.

This anthem was replaced in 1984 by a new anthem, the Ditanyè.

See also 
 History of Burkina Faso
 List of governors of Upper Volta
 List of heads of state of Burkina Faso
 List of heads of government of Burkina Faso

References 

French West Africa
Former colonies in Africa
Former French colonies
French colonisation in Africa
Upper Volta
20th century in Burkina Faso
States and territories established in 1958
States and territories disestablished in 1960
1958 establishments in French West Africa
1958 establishments in the French colonial empire
1960 disestablishments in the French colonial empire
Burkina Faso–France relations